Alexis Wajsbrot is a French film director, producer, and visual effects supervisor best known for his 2016 horror film Don't Hang Up.

Wajsbrot's directorial debut was the short film Red Balloon, a 13-minute thriller, which he co-directed. In 2010 he won the Directorial Discovery Award at the Rhode Island International Horror Film Festival and 35 selections in others.

As well as being a director, Wajsbrot is a visual effects supervisor.  In 2014 he won a Visual Effect Society Award on Alfonso Cuarón's Gravity for Outstanding FX and Simulation Animation in a Live Action Motion Picture.

Filmography

References

External links

Official Alexis Wajsbrot Website

French film directors
British film directors
Living people
Year of birth missing (living people)